SS Sea Carp may refer to one of two Type C3-S-A2 ships built for the United States Maritime Commission:

  (MC hull number 274), built by Western Pipe and Steel; acquired by the United States Navy and converted to  USS Clay (AP-84/APA-39); sold for commercial service in 1948; scrapped in 1974
  (MC hull number 881), built by Ingalls Shipbuilding; delivered in March 1945; sold 1947; scrapped in 1971

Ship names